Gonzalo Favre (born July 3, 1978 in San Carlos Centro, Argentina) is a former Argentine footballer who played for Colón de Santa Fe in Argentina and Rangers in Chile.

Today he is retired with 40 years old and lives in San Carlos Norte, Argentina.  He is married with four children: Luisina 21, Augusto 21, Guillermina 13 and Bruno 17. He works in a rural area and now accompanies his two sons to football, in the Central Club San Carlos, San Carlos Centro, Argentina.

Teams
  Colón de Santa Fe 1998-2001
  Rangers 2001-2002

References
 

1978 births
Living people
Argentine footballers
Argentine expatriate footballers
Club Atlético Colón footballers
Rangers de Talca footballers
Expatriate footballers in Chile
Association footballers not categorized by position